The Schuelke Organ Company was a Milwaukee, Wisconsin-based pipe organ builder.  Schuelke Organs operated in the later 19th and early 20th centuries.

William Schuelke was a Prussian immigrant who came to the United States in 1874.  Schuelke's contributions to organ building included inventing the electric motor powered bellows crank, for which he received a patent.  This was a major improvement over existing hand-cranked bellows.

The Schuelke Organ Company ceased operations in the early 20th century.  Today, few of the organs his company produced exist intact.

A yearly free organ recital is held at Saint Francis of Assisi Catholic Church, Milwaukee on the first Sunday of November to showcase its 1885 Schuelke pipe organ.

Locations with a Schuelke organ

 Bethany Lutheran Church, Ishpeming, Michigan
 Emmanuel Lutheran Church, Mecan, Wisconsin
 First Lutheran Church, Middleton, Wisconsin
 First Presbyterian Church, Leadville, Colorado
 First Presbyterian Church, Waunakee, Wisconsin
 John Paul II Roman Catholic Church, Carroll, Iowa
 Our Lady of the Lake Catholic Church, Ashland, Wisconsin
 Ozaukee Congregational Church, Grafton, Wisconsin
 Saint Anthony of Padua Catholic Church, Milwaukee, Wisconsin
 Saint Anthony of Padua Church, St. Louis, Missouri
 Saint Boniface Church New Vienna, Iowa
 Saint Francis of Assisi Catholic Church, Milwaukee, Wisconsin
 Saint Mary's Catholic Church, Columbus, Ohio
 Saint Mary's Catholic Church, Remsen, Iowa
 Trinity Evangelical Lutheran Church, Milwaukee, Wisconsin destroyed by fire, May 15, 2018

External links
 
 
 

Pipe organ building companies
Defunct manufacturing companies based in Milwaukee
Musical instrument manufacturing companies of the United States